Route crime is a phrase used by the British rail industry to denote trespass and vandalism. It is believed to be the cause of most deaths to members of the public on the railways in Britain. Most route crime-related deaths are suicides with the rest being trespass-related.

Criminal damage and trespass on the railways

Acts which can be classified as route crime include:

 People putting obstructions in front of trains
 Trespassing and vandalising the railway infrastructure, including trains

To tackle route crime, British Transport Police works in partnership with Network Rail, train operating companies (TOCs), rail staff and the public.

Operation Silverback 
British Transport Police launched this nationwide operation on 20 December 2006 to target graffiti. On the first day BTP made 23 arrests. Traditionally vandalism has increased on the railways over the Christmas period.

See also
 British Transport Police
 Criminal damage in English law

Notes

External links
British Transport Police
British Transport Police Special Constabulary website
Track Off
BBC Crimefighters: British Transport Police
 Damage to Property The Crown Prosecution Service website
 Non profit graffiti site concentrated on the train scene of Europe
 Community Safety Resource Centre

British Transport Police
Law enforcement in the United Kingdom
Rail transport in the United Kingdom